The Woods is a 1977 play by David Mamet. The show involves a young couple's weekend at a lakeside cabin. Mamet banned the play from being put on in New York in 1985, but lifted the ban unexpectedly in 1996 for actress Danielle Kwatinetz.

Plot
The play is about a couple, Nick and Ruth, spending a night at a house in the country. They push their relationship to the breaking point in a night of stories and fights, only to rediscover their need for one another in the morning.

The play takes place on the front porch of Nick's family's summerhouse, where he and Ruth are spending the night. The Woods ends with a bed-time story, but the final reconciliation remains uncomfortably tempered by the violent core we now know to be hiding beneath the soothing words.

Productions
The original production premiered on November 11, 1977 produced by the St. Nicholas Theatre Company in Chicago, and was directed by Mamet. It starred Patti Lupone and Peter Weller. Set design was by Michael Merritt, lighting by Robert Christen, graphic design by Lois Grimm, and the production was presented in arrangement with Ken Marsolais.

The play's New York City premiere was in 1979, Off-Broadway at the Public Theater, where it was produced by Joseph Papp, directed by Ulu Grosbard, and starred Chris Sarandon and Christine Lahti. Set design was by John Lee Beatty, costume design by Robert Wojewodski, and lighting design by Jennifer Tipton.

In 1982, Mamet directed an Off-Broadway revival of The Woods at the Second Stage Theatre, again starring Patti Lupone and Peter Weller.

In 1985, Mamet imposed a ban on New York productions of the play. In December 1996, Mamet unexpectedly lifted the ban, and granted rights to young producer and actor Danielle Kwatinetz. This resulted a special four-night Off-Off-Broadway engagement at the Producer’s Club in January 1997, starring Danielle Kwatinetz and Eric Martin Brown, and directed by David Travis. Lighting design was by Dan and Chris Scully, and set design was by Devorah Herbert.

Background and analysis
The Woods examines the archetypal differences and interplay between men and women. Paul Taylor in The Independent writes that "The Woods ... was expressly written to examine the question 'why don't men and women get along?'"

In the Chicago Reader, Diana Spinrad writes: 

Sarah Lansdale Stevenson notes the play's "precision of ... language," "rhythm and repetition," "intricate image patterns," and "elegant simplicity of image patterns," and observes that:

And Mamet opines that, "It is a dreamy play, full of the symbology of dream and the symbology of myth, which are basically the same thing."

Reception
Although The Woods has always maintained a certain following, critical reception of the play has tended to be indifferent or harsh. On the 1982 New York revival, Frank Rich wrote in the New York Times: 

Mamet himself has said:

References

External links
 
 The Woods: A Drama on GoogleBooks
 Vijayaraghavan, Vineeta. "Lost in Mamet's Woods." The Harvard Crimson. December 13, 1991.
 Richards, David. "Mamet's Women." New York Times. January 3, 1993.

1977 plays
Off-Broadway plays
Plays by David Mamet
Two-handers